Sari Jael Raber (born January 1, 1986) is a Canadian retired soccer player who played as a midfielder. She has been a member of the Canada women's national team.

References

1986 births
Living people
Soccer players from Edmonton
Canadian women's soccer players
Women's association football midfielders
Nebraska Cornhuskers women's soccer players
Canada women's international soccer players
Canadian expatriate women's soccer players
Canadian expatriate sportspeople in the United States
Expatriate women's soccer players in the United States
Ottawa Fury (women) players
USL W-League (1995–2015) players
Vancouver Whitecaps (1974–1984) players